The West Indian Prisons Act 1838 (1 & 2 Vict. c. 67) was an Act of Parliament in the United Kingdom, signed into law on 4 August 1838.

The Act empowered the Queen in Council and the governor and council of any colony to make rules for the government of the prisons of each colony in the West Indies. These were to be binding on all persons, but had to be laid before Parliament. It also empowered the Queen to appoint inspectors of prisons, or to authorize their appointment by the governor of the colony; obstruction of these inspectors in their duties would be subject to a penalty of £20. The governor was to be sent regular returns and plans of prisons, and no person was to be kept in a prison which he certified unfit. He had the power to suspend or dismiss officers of prisons.

The Act was to be proclaimed in the Colonies.

References
The British almanac of the Society for the Diffusion of Useful Knowledge, for the year 1839. The Society for the Diffusion of Useful Knowledge, London, 1839.

1838 in British law
United Kingdom Acts of Parliament 1838